The 2017 NCAA Division II women's basketball tournament involved 64 teams playing in a single-elimination tournament to determine the NCAA Division II women's college basketball national champion. It began on March 10, 2017, and concluded with the championship game on March 24, 2017.

The first three rounds were hosted by top-seeded teams in regional play. The eight regional winners met for the quarterfinal and semifinals, better known as the "Elite Eight" and "Final Four" respectively, and National Championship game at the Alumni Hall in Columbus, Ohio.

The Ashland Eagles completed an undefeated season by defeating Virginia Union 93–77 to finish 37-0.

Brackets

Atlantic Regional
 Site: California, Pennsylvania (California (PA))

Central Regional
 Site: Searcy, Arkansas (Harding)

East Regional
 Site: Garden City, New York (Adelphi)

Midwest Regional
 Site: Ashland, Ohio (Ashland)

South Regional
 Site: St. Petersburg, Florida (Eckerd)

Southeast Regional
 Site: Columbus, Georgia (Columbus State)

South Central Regional
 Site: Pueblo, Colorado (Colorado State-Pueblo)

West Regional
 Site: Anchorage, Alaska (Alaska Anchorage)

Finals
Quarterfinals, semifinals and finals were hosted at Alumni Hall in Columbus, Ohio.

See also
 2017 NCAA Division I women's basketball tournament
 2017 NCAA Division III women's basketball tournament
 2017 NAIA Division I women's basketball tournament
 2017 NAIA Division II women's basketball tournament
 2017 NCAA Division II men's basketball tournament

References

NCAA Division II women's basketball tournament
NCAA tournament